Fabrice Josso (born 11 February 1967) is a French actor who is specialized particularly in the dubbing industry.

He is notable for his roles in Sans famille, Exploits of a Young Don Juan (1986) and Mune: Guardian of the Moon (2014).

Filmography

Live-action
 1985: À nous les garçons
 1986: Exploits of a Young Don Juan – Roger
 1987: Les nouveaux tricheurs – Karl
 1988: Corps z'a corps – Albin, le fils de M. de Villecresne
 1990: Flight from Paradise – Téo

Animation
 2000: Carnivale – Enzo
 2006–2007 : Squirrel Boy – Polar Bear
 2007–2013 : Oscar's Oasis – Wig
 2008–2010 : The Marvelous Misadventures of Flapjack – Eight-Armed Willy
 2009–2012 : Hot Wheels: Battle Force 5 – Shy Diad (yelling, screaming 'n' laughing, as well as her weird 'n' random sounds/voice)
 2014 : Mune: Guardian of the Moon – Spleen

Dubbing
 Billy Crudup
 Waking the Dead (2000) – Fielding Pierce
 Stage Beauty (2004) – Ned Kynaston
 Mission: Impossible III (2006) – John Musgrave
 Watchmen (2009) – Jon Osterman / Dr. Manhattan
 Too Big to Fail (2011) – Timothy Geithner
 Alien: Covenant (2017) – Chris Oram
 Justice League (2017) – Henry Allen
 Gypsy (2017) – Michael Holloway
 Jensen Ackles
 Dark Angel (2001–2002) – Alec McDowell / X5-494
 Dawson's Creek (2002–2003) – C.J. Braxton
 Smallville (2004–2005) – Jason Teague
 Supernatural (2005–present) – Dean Winchester
 Devour (2005) – Jake Gray
 My Bloody Valentine 3D (2009) – Tom Hanniger
 Johnny Galecki
 Happy Endings (2005) – Miles
 Hope & Faith (2005–2006) – Jay
 The Big Bang Theory (2007–2019) – Leonard Hofstadter
 In Time (2011) – Borel
 Entourage (2011) – Johnny Galecki

References

External links
 
 

1969 births
Living people
French male actors
French male child actors
French male voice actors